The Mozambique sea catfish (Plicofollis polystaphylodon), also known as the Mozambican sea catfish, is a species of catfish in the family Ariidae. It was described by Pieter Bleeker in 1846, originally under the genus Arius. It inhabits marine and freshwaters in the western Pacific and western Indian Ocean.

The diet of the Mozambique sea catfish consists of benthic invertebrates. It is harvested by commercial fisheries, and its meat is generally marketed fresh.

References

Ariidae
Fish described in 1846